The English Channel, also known as simply the Channel (or historically as the British Channel), is an arm of the Atlantic Ocean that separates Southern England from northern France. It links to the southern part of the North Sea by the Strait of Dover at its northeastern end. It is the busiest shipping area in the world.

The Channel was a key factor in Britain becoming a naval superpower and has been utilised by Britain as a natural defence mechanism by which many would-be invasions, such as the Napoleonic Wars and those of Adolf Hitler in World War II, were halted.

The population around the English Channel is predominantly located on the English coast and the major languages spoken in this region are English and French.

Names 

Variations of this term were used by influential writers such as Ptolemy, and remained popular with British and continental authors well into the modern era. Other Latin names for the sea include  (the Gaulish Ocean) which was used by Isidore of Seville in the sixth century.

While it is likely that these names derive from the Latin term, it is possible that they predate the arrival of the Romans in the area.

One English name that did persist was the Narrow Seas, a collective term for the channel and North Sea. As England (followed by Great Britain and the United Kingdom) claimed sovereignty over the sea, a Royal Navy Admiral was appointed with maintaining duties in the two seas. The office was maintained until 1822, when several European nations (including the United Kingdom) adopted a three-mile limit to territorial waters.

English Channel 

The word channel was first recorded in Middle English in the 13th century and was borrowed from Old French  (a variant form of  'canal'). By the middle of the fifteenth century an Italian map based on Ptolemy's description named the sea as Britanicus Oceanus nunc Canalites Anglie (British Ocean but now English Channel). The map is possibly the first recorded use of the term English Channel and the description suggests the name had recently been adopted.

By the eighteenth century, the name English Channel was in common usage in England. Following the Acts of Union 1707, this was replaced in official maps and documents with British Channel or British Sea for much of the next century. However, the term English Channel remained popular and was finally in official usage by the nineteenth century.

The French name  has been used since at least the 17th century. The name is usually said to refer to the sleeve shape of the Channel. Folk etymology has derived it from a Celtic word meaning 'channel' that is also the source of the name for the Minch in Scotland, but this name is not attested before the 17th century, and French and British sources of that time are clear about its etymology. The name in French has been directly adapted in other languages as either a calque or as a direct borrowing.

Nature

Geography 

 

The International Hydrographic Organization defines the limits of the English Channel as follows:

The IHO defines the southwestern limit of the North Sea as "a line joining the Walde Lighthouse (France, 1°55'E) and Leathercoat Point (England, 51°10'N)".

The Strait of Dover, at the Channel's eastern end, is its narrowest point, while its widest point lies between Lyme Bay and the Gulf of Saint Malo, near its midpoint.
 
The eastern region along the French coast between Cherbourg and the mouth of the Seine river at Le Havre is frequently referred to as the Bay of the Seine.

There are several major islands in the Channel, the most notable being the Isle of Wight off the English coast, and the Channel Islands, British Crown Dependencies off the coast of France. The coastline, particularly on the French shore, is deeply indented; several small islands close to the coastline, including Chausey and Mont Saint-Michel, are within French jurisdiction. The Cotentin Peninsula in France juts out into the Channel, whilst on the English side there is a small parallel strait known as the Solent between the Isle of Wight and the mainland. The Celtic Sea is to the west of the Channel.

The Channel acts as a funnel that amplifies the tidal range from less than a metre as observed at sea to more than 6 metres as observed in the Channel Islands, the west coast of the Cotentin Peninsula and the north coast of Brittany. The time difference of about six hours between high water at the eastern and western limits of the Channel is indicative of the tidal range being amplified further by resonance.

In the UK Shipping Forecast the Channel is divided into the following areas, from the east:
 Dover
 Wight
 Portland
 Plymouth

Geological origins 

The Channel is of geologically recent origin, having been dry land for most of the Pleistocene period. Before the Devensian glaciation (the most recent glacial period, which ended around 10,000 years ago), Britain and Ireland were part of continental Europe, linked by an unbroken Weald–Artois anticline, a ridge that acted as a natural dam holding back a large freshwater pro-glacial lake in the Doggerland region, now submerged under the North Sea. During this period the North Sea and almost all of the British Isles were covered by ice. The lake was fed by meltwater from the Baltic and from the Caledonian and Scandinavian ice sheets that joined to the north, blocking its exit. The sea level was about  lower than it is today. Then, between 450,000 and 180,000 years ago, at least two catastrophic glacial lake outburst floods breached the Weald–Artois anticline.

The first flood of 450 thousand years ago  would have lasted for several months, releasing as much as one million cubic metres of water per second. The flood started with large but localised waterfalls over the ridge, which excavated depressions now known as the Fosses Dangeard. The flow eroded the retaining ridge, causing the rock dam to fail and releasing lake water into the Atlantic. After multiple episodes of changing sea level, during which the Fosses Dangeard were largely infilled by various layers of sediment, another catastrophic flood some 180,000 years ago carved a large bedrock-floored valley, the Lobourg Channel, some 500 m wide and 25 m deep, from the southern North Sea basin through the centre of the Straits of Dover and into the English Channel. It left streamlined islands, longitudinal erosional grooves, and other features characteristic of catastrophic megaflood events, still present on the sea floor and now revealed by high-resolution sonar. Through the scoured channel passed a river, the Channel River, which drained the combined Rhine and Thames westwards to the Atlantic.

The flooding destroyed the ridge that connected Britain to continental Europe, although a land connection across the southern North Sea would have existed intermittently at later times when periods of glaciation resulted in lowering of sea levels. At the end of the last glacial period, rising sea levels finally severed the last land connection.

Ecology 
As a busy shipping lane, the Channel experiences environmental problems following accidents involving ships with toxic cargo and oil spills. Indeed, over 40% of the UK incidents threatening pollution occur in or very near the Channel. One occurrence was the MSC Napoli, which on 18 January 2007 was beached with nearly 1700 tonnes of dangerous cargo in Lyme Bay, a protected World Heritage Site coastline. The ship had been damaged and was en route to Portland Harbour.

The English Channel, despite being a busy shipping lane, remains in part a haven for wildlife. Atlantic oceanic species are more common in the westernmost parts of the channel, particularly to the west of Start Point, Devon, but can sometimes be found further east towards Dorset and the Isle of Wight. Seal sightings are becoming more common along the English Channel, with both Grey Seal and Harbour Seal recorded frequently.

Human history 

The Channel, which delayed human reoccupation of Great Britain for more than 100,000 years, has in historic times been both an easy entry for seafaring people and a key natural defence, halting invading armies while in conjunction with control of the North Sea allowing Britain to blockade the continent. The most significant failed invasion threats came when the Dutch and Belgian ports were held by a major continental power, e.g. from the Spanish Armada in 1588, Napoleon during the Napoleonic Wars, and Nazi Germany during World War II. Successful invasions include the Roman conquest of Britain, the Norman Conquest in 1066 and the Glorious Revolution of 1688, while the concentration of excellent harbours in the Western Channel on Britain's south coast made possible the largest amphibious invasion in history, the Normandy Landings in 1944. Channel naval battles include the Battle of the Downs (1639), Battle of Dover (1652), the Battle of Portland (1653), the Battle of La Hougue (1692) and the engagement between USS Kearsarge and CSS Alabama (1864).

In more peaceful times the Channel served as a link joining shared cultures and political structures, particularly the huge Angevin Empire from 1135 to 1217. For nearly a thousand years, the Channel also provided a link between the Modern Celtic regions and languages of Cornwall and Brittany. Brittany was founded by Britons who fled Cornwall and Devon after Anglo-Saxon encroachment. In Brittany, there is a region known as "Cornouaille" (Cornwall) in French and "Kernev" in Breton. In ancient times there was also a "Domnonia" (Devon) in Brittany as well.

Route to Britain 

Remnants of a mesolithic boatyard have been found on the Isle of Wight. Wheat was traded across the Channel about 8,000 years ago. "... Sophisticated social networks linked the Neolithic front in southern Europe to the Mesolithic peoples of northern Europe." The Ferriby Boats, Hanson Log Boats and the later Dover Bronze Age Boat could carry a substantial cross-Channel cargo.

Diodorus Siculus and Pliny both suggest trade between the rebel Celtic tribes of Armorica and Iron Age Britain flourished. In 55 BC Julius Caesar invaded, claiming that the Britons had aided the Veneti against him the previous year. He was more successful in 54 BC, but Britain was not fully established as part of the Roman Empire until completion of the invasion by Aulus Plautius in 43 AD. A brisk and regular trade began between ports in Roman Gaul and those in Britain. This traffic continued until the end of Roman rule in Britain in 410 AD, after which the early Anglo-Saxons left less clear historical records.

In the power vacuum left by the retreating Romans, the Germanic Angles, Saxons, and Jutes began the next great migration across the North Sea. Having already been used as mercenaries in Britain by the Romans, many people from these tribes crossed during the Migration Period, conquering and perhaps displacing the native Celtic populations.

Norsemen and Normans 

The attack on Lindisfarne in 793 is generally considered the beginning of the Viking Age. For the next 250 years the Scandinavian raiders of Norway, Sweden, and Denmark dominated the North Sea, raiding monasteries, homes, and towns along the coast and along the rivers that ran inland. According to the Anglo-Saxon Chronicle they began to settle in Britain in 851. They continued to settle in the British Isles and the continent until around 1050, with some raids recorded along the channel coast of England, including at Wareham, Portland, near Weymouth and along the river Teign in Devon.

The fiefdom of Normandy was created for the Viking leader Rollo (also known as Robert of Normandy). Rollo had besieged Paris but in 911 entered vassalage to the king of the West Franks Charles the Simple through the Treaty of St.-Claire-sur-Epte. In exchange for his homage and fealty, Rollo legally gained the territory he and his Viking allies had previously conquered. The name "Normandy" reflects Rollo's Viking (i.e. "Northman") origins.

The descendants of Rollo and his followers adopted the local Gallo-Romance language and intermarried with the area's inhabitants and became the Normans – a Norman French-speaking mixture of Scandinavians, Hiberno-Norse, Orcadians, Anglo-Danish, and indigenous Franks and Gauls.

Rollo's descendant William, Duke of Normandy became king of England in 1066 in the Norman Conquest beginning with the Battle of Hastings, while retaining the fiefdom of Normandy for himself and his descendants. In 1204, during the reign of King John, mainland Normandy was taken from England by France under Philip II, while insular Normandy (the Channel Islands) remained under English control. In 1259, Henry III of England recognised the legality of French possession of mainland Normandy under the Treaty of Paris. His successors, however, often fought to regain control of mainland Normandy.

With the rise of William the Conqueror the North Sea and Channel began to lose some of their importance. The new order oriented most of England and Scandinavia's trade south, toward the Mediterranean and the Orient.

Although the British surrendered claims to mainland Normandy and other French possessions in 1801, the monarch of the United Kingdom retains the title Duke of Normandy in respect to the Channel Islands. The Channel Islands (except for Chausey) are Crown Dependencies of the British Crown. Thus the Loyal toast in the Channel Islands is Le roi, notre Duc ("The King, our Duke"). The British monarch is understood to not be the Duke of Normandy in regards of the French region of Normandy described herein, by virtue of the Treaty of Paris of 1259, the surrender of French possessions in 1801, and the belief that the rights of succession to that title are subject to Salic Law which excludes inheritance through female heirs.

French Normandy was occupied by English forces during the Hundred Years' War in 1346–1360 and again in 1415–1450.

England and Britain: Naval superpower 

From the reign of Elizabeth I, English foreign policy concentrated on preventing invasion across the Channel by ensuring no major European power controlled the potential Dutch and Flemish invasion ports. Her climb to the pre-eminent sea power of the world began in 1588 as the attempted invasion of the Spanish Armada was defeated by the combination of outstanding naval tactics by the English and the Dutch under command of Charles Howard, 1st Earl of Nottingham with Sir Francis Drake second in command, and the following stormy weather. Over the centuries the Royal Navy slowly grew to be the most powerful in the world.

The building of the British Empire was possible only because the Royal Navy eventually managed to exercise unquestioned control over the seas around Europe, especially the Channel and the North Sea. During the Seven Years' War, France attempted to launch an invasion of Britain. To achieve this France needed to gain control of the Channel for several weeks, but was thwarted following the British naval victory at the Battle of Quiberon Bay in 1759 and was unsuccessful (The last French landing on English soil being in 1690 with a raid on Teignmouth, although the last French raid on British soil was a raid on Fishguard, Wales in 1797).

Another significant challenge to British domination of the seas came during the Napoleonic Wars. The Battle of Trafalgar took place off the coast of Spain against a combined French and Spanish fleet and was won by Admiral Horatio Nelson, ending Napoleon's plans for a cross-Channel invasion and securing British dominance of the seas for over a century.

First World War 
The exceptional strategic importance of the Channel as a tool for blockading was recognised by the First Sea Lord Admiral Fisher in the years before World War I. "Five keys lock up the world! Singapore, the Cape, Alexandria, Gibraltar, Dover."  However, on 25 July 1909 Louis Blériot made the first Channel crossing from Calais to Dover in an aeroplane. Blériot's crossing signalled a change in the function of the Channel as a barrier-moat for England against foreign enemies.

Because the Kaiserliche Marine surface fleet could not match the British Grand Fleet, the Germans developed submarine warfare, which was to become a far greater threat to Britain.  The Dover Patrol,  set up just before the war started, escorted cross-Channel troopships and prevented submarines from sailing in the Channel, obliging them to travel to the Atlantic via the much longer route around Scotland.

On land, the German army attempted to capture French Channel ports in the Race to the Sea but although the trenches are often said to have stretched "from the frontier of Switzerland to the English Channel", they reached the coast at the North Sea.  Much of the British war effort in Flanders was a bloody but successful strategy to prevent the Germans reaching the Channel coast.

At the outset of the war, an attempt was made to block the path of U-boats through the Dover Strait with naval minefields.  By February 1915, this had been augmented by a  stretch of light steel netting called the Dover Barrage, which it was hoped would ensnare submerged submarines. After initial success, the Germans learned how to pass through the barrage, aided by the unreliability of British mines.  On 31 January 1917, the Germans restarted unrestricted submarine warfare leading to dire Admiralty predictions that submarines would defeat Britain by November, the most dangerous situation Britain faced in either world war.

The Battle of Passchendaele in 1917 was fought to reduce the threat by capturing the submarine bases on the Belgian coast, though it was the introduction of convoys and not capture of the bases that averted defeat.  In April 1918 the Dover Patrol carried out the Zeebrugge Raid against the U-boat bases.  During 1917, the Dover Barrage was re-sited with improved mines and more effective nets, aided by regular patrols by small warships equipped with powerful searchlights.  A German attack on these vessels resulted in the Battle of Dover Strait in 1917.  A much more ambitious attempt to improve the barrage, by installing eight massive concrete towers across the strait was called the Admiralty M-N Scheme but only two towers were nearing completion at the end of the war and the project was abandoned.

The naval blockade in the Channel and North Sea was one of the decisive factors in the German defeat in 1918.

Second World War 

During the Second World War, naval activity in the European theatre was primarily limited to the Atlantic. During the Battle of France in May 1940, the German forces succeeded in capturing both Boulogne and Calais, thereby threatening the line of retreat for the British Expeditionary Force. By a combination of hard fighting and German indecision, the port of Dunkirk was kept open allowing 338,000 Allied troops to be evacuated in Operation Dynamo. More than 11,000 were evacuated from Le Havre during Operation Cycle and a further 192,000 were evacuated from ports further down the coast in Operation Aerial in June 1940. The early stages of the Battle of Britain featured German air attacks on Channel shipping and ports; despite these early successes against shipping the Germans did not win the air supremacy necessary for Operation Sealion, the projected cross-Channel invasion.

The Channel subsequently became the stage for an intensive coastal war, featuring submarines, minesweepers, and Fast Attack Craft.

The narrow waters of the Channel were considered too dangerous for major warships until the Normandy Landings with the exception, for the German Kriegsmarine, of the Channel Dash (Operation Cerberus) in February 1942, and this required the support of the Luftwaffe in Operation Thunderbolt.

Dieppe was the site of an ill-fated Dieppe Raid by Canadian and British armed forces. More successful was the later Operation Overlord (D-Day), a massive invasion of German-occupied France by Allied troops. Caen, Cherbourg, Carentan, Falaise and other Norman towns endured many casualties in the fight for the province, which continued until the closing of the so-called Falaise gap between Chambois and Montormel, then liberation of Le Havre.

The Channel Islands were the only part of the British Commonwealth occupied by Germany (excepting the part of Egypt occupied by the Afrika Korps at the time of the Second Battle of El Alamein, which was a protectorate and not part of the Commonwealth). The German occupation of 1940–1945 was harsh, with some island residents being taken for slave labour on the Continent; native Jews sent to concentration camps; partisan resistance and retribution; accusations of collaboration; and slave labour (primarily Russians and eastern Europeans) being brought to the islands to build fortifications. The Royal Navy blockaded the islands from time to time, particularly following the liberation of mainland Normandy in 1944. Intense negotiations resulted in some Red Cross humanitarian aid, but there was considerable hunger and privation during the occupation, particularly in the final months, when the population was close to starvation. The German troops on the islands surrendered on 9 May 1945, a day after the final surrender in mainland Europe.

Population 
The English Channel coast is far more densely populated on the English shore. The most significant towns and cities along both the English and French sides of the Channel (each with more than 20,000 inhabitants, ranked in descending order; populations are the urban area populations from the 1999 French census, 2001 UK census, and 2001 Jersey census) are as follows:

England 

 Brighton–Worthing–Littlehampton: 461,181 inhabitants, made up of:
 Brighton: 155,919
 Worthing: 96,964
 Hove: 72,335
 Littlehampton: 55,716
 Lancing–Sompting: 30,360
 Portsmouth: 442,252, including
 Gosport: 79,200
 Bournemouth & Poole: 383,713
 Southampton: 304,400
 Plymouth: 258,700
 Torbay (Torquay): 129,702
 Hastings–Bexhill: 126,386
 Exeter: 119,600
 Eastbourne: 106,562
 Bognor Regis: 62,141
 Folkestone–Hythe: 60,039
 Weymouth: 56,043
 Dover: 39,078
 Walmer–Deal: 35,941
 Exmouth: 32,972
 Falmouth–Penryn: 28,801
 Ryde: 22,806
 St Austell: 22,658
 Seaford: 21,851
 Falmouth: 21,635
 Penzance: 20,255

France 

 Le Havre: 248,547 inhabitants
 Calais: 104,852
 Saint-Malo: 50,675
 Lannion–Perros-Guirec: 48,990
 Saint-Brieuc: 45,879
 Boulogne-sur-Mer: 42,537
 Cherbourg: 42,318
 Dieppe: 42,202
 Morlaix: 35,996
 Dinard: 25,006
 Étaples–Le Touquet-Paris-Plage: 23,994
 Fécamp: 22,717
 Eu–Le Tréport: 22,019
 Trouville-sur-Mer–Deauville: 20,406

Channel Islands 
 Saint Helier, Jersey: 28,310 inhabitants
 Saint Peter Port, Guernsey: 16,488 inhabitants
 Saint Anne, Alderney: 2,200 inhabitants
 Sark: 600 inhabitants
 Herm: 60 inhabitants

Culture and languages 

The two dominant cultures are English on the north shore of the Channel, French on the south. However, there are also a number of minority languages that are or were found on the shores and islands of the English Channel, which are listed here, with the Channel's name in the specific language following them.

Celtic Languages
 , Sea of Brittany
 
 , Merciful Sea
Germanic languages
 English
 , the Channel. (Dutch previously had a larger range, and extended into parts of modern-day France as French Flemish.)
Romance languages
 
 Gallo: Manche, Grand-Mè, Mè Bertone
 Norman, including the Channel Island vernaculars:
 Anglo-Norman (extinct, but fossilised in certain English law phrases)
 Auregnais (extinct)
 Cotentinais: Maunche
 Guernésiais: 
 Jèrriais: 
 Sercquais
 Picard

Most other languages tend towards variants of the French and English forms, but notably Welsh has .

Economy

Shipping 
The Channel has traffic on both the UK–Europe and North Sea–Atlantic routes, and is the world's busiest seaway, with over 500 ships per day. Following an accident in January 1971 and a series of disastrous collisions with wreckage in February, the Dover TSS, the world's first radar-controlled traffic separation scheme, was set up by the International Maritime Organization. The scheme mandates that vessels travelling north must use the French side, travelling south the English side. There is a separation zone between the two lanes.

The cargo ship Nicola ran into the wreckage the next day. There was no loss of life.

The shore-based long-range traffic control system was updated in 2003 and there is a series of traffic separation systems in operation. Though the system is inherently incapable of reaching the levels of safety obtained from aviation systems such as the traffic collision avoidance system, it has reduced accidents to one or two per year.

Marine GPS systems allow ships to be preprogrammed to follow navigational channels accurately and automatically, further avoiding risk of running aground, but following the fatal collision between Dutch Aquamarine and Ash in October 2001, Britain's Marine Accident Investigation Branch (MAIB) issued a safety bulletin saying it believed that in these most unusual circumstances GPS use had actually contributed to the collision. The ships were maintaining a very precise automated course, one directly behind the other, rather than making use of the full width of the traffic lanes as a human navigator would.

A combination of radar difficulties in monitoring areas near cliffs, a failure of a CCTV system, incorrect operation of the anchor, the inability of the crew to follow standard procedures of using a GPS to provide early warning of the ship dragging the anchor and reluctance to admit the mistake and start the engine led to the MV Willy running aground in Cawsand Bay, Cornwall, in January 2002. The MAIB report makes it clear that the harbour controllers were informed of impending disaster by shore observers before the crew were themselves aware. The village of Kingsand was evacuated for three days because of the risk of explosion, and the ship was stranded for 11 days.

Ferry 

The ferry routes crossing the English Channel, include (have included):-
 Dover–Calais
 Dover–Dunkirk
 Newhaven–Dieppe
 Plymouth–Roscoff
 Poole–Cherbourg
 Poole–Jersey and Guernsey
 Poole–Saint Malo
 Portsmouth–Cherbourg
 Portsmouth–Jersey and Guernsey
 Portsmouth–Le Havre
 Portsmouth–Ouistreham
 Portsmouth–Saint Malo
 Rosslare–Cherbourg
 Rosslare–Roscoff
 Weymouth–Saint Malo
Brighton Marina to Dieppe (using the SeaJet for a 100 minute crossing)

Channel Tunnel 

Many travellers cross beneath the Channel using the Channel Tunnel, first proposed in the early 19th century and finally opened in 1994, connecting the UK and France by rail. It is now routine to travel between Paris or Brussels and London on the Eurostar train. Freight trains also use the tunnel. Cars, coaches and lorries are carried on Eurotunnel Shuttle trains between Folkestone and Calais.

Tourism 

The coastal resorts of the Channel, such as Brighton and Deauville, inaugurated an era of aristocratic tourism in the early 19th century. Short trips across the Channel for leisure purposes are often referred to as Channel Hopping.

Renewable energy 
The Rampion Wind Farm is an offshore wind farm located in the Channel, off the coast of West Sussex.  Other offshore wind farms planned on the French side of the Channel.

History of Channel crossings 

As one of the narrowest and most well-known international waterways lacking dangerous currents, the Channel has been the first objective of numerous innovative sea, air, and human powered crossing technologies.
Pre-historic people sailed from the mainland to England for millennia. At the end of the last Ice Age, lower sea levels even permitted walking across.

By boat 

Pierre Andriel crossed the English Channel aboard the Élise, ex the Scottish p.s. "Margery" in March 1816, one of the earliest seagoing voyages by steam ship.

The paddle steamer Defiance, Captain William Wager, was the first steamer to cross the Channel to Holland, arriving there on 9 May 1816.

On 10 June 1821, English-built paddle steamer Rob Roy was the first passenger ferry to cross channel. The steamer was purchased subsequently by the French postal administration and renamed Henri IV and put into regular passenger service a year later. It was able to make the journey across the Straits of Dover in around three hours.

In June 1843, because of difficulties with Dover harbour, the South Eastern Railway company developed the Boulogne-sur-Mer-Folkestone route as an alternative to Calais-Dover. The first ferry crossed under the command of Captain Hayward.

In 1974 a Welsh coracle piloted by Bernard Thomas of Llechryd crossed the English Channel to France in 13 hours. The journey was undertaken to demonstrate how the Bull Boats of the Mandan Indians of North Dakota could have been copied from coracles introduced by Prince Madog in the 12th century.

The Mountbatten class hovercraft (MCH) entered commercial service in August 1968, initially between Dover and Boulogne but later also Ramsgate (Pegwell Bay) to Calais. The journey time Dover to Boulogne was roughly 35 minutes, with six trips per day at peak times. The fastest crossing of the English Channel by a commercial car-carrying hovercraft was 22 minutes, recorded by the Princess Anne MCH SR-N4 Mk3 on 14 September 1995,

By air 

The first aircraft to cross the Channel was a balloon in 1785, piloted by Jean Pierre François Blanchard (France) and John Jeffries (US).

Louis Blériot (France) piloted the first airplane to cross in 1909.

On 26 September 2008, Swiss Yves Rossy aka Jetman became the first person to cross the English Channel with a Jet Powered Wing,
He jumped from a Pilatus Porter over Calais, France, Rossy crossed the English Channel where he deployed his parachute and landed in Dover

The first flying car to have crossed the English Channel is a Pégase designed by the French company Vaylon on 14 June 2017. It was piloted by a Franco-Italian pilot Bruno Vezzoli. This crossing was carried out as part of the first road and air trip from Paris to London in a flying car. Pegase is a 2 seats road approved dune buggy and a powered paraglider. The takeoff was at 8:03 a.m. from Ambleteuse in the North of France and landing was at East Studdal, near Dover.

On 12 June 1979, the first human-powered aircraft to cross the English Channel was the Gossamer Albatross, built by American aeronautical engineer Dr. Paul B. MacCready's company AeroVironment, and piloted by Bryan Allen. The  crossing was completed in 2 hours and 49 minutes.

On 4 August 2019, Frenchman Franky Zapata became the first person to cross the English Channel on a jet-powered Flyboard Air. The board was powered by a kerosene-filled backpack. Zapata made the   journey in 22 minutes, having landed on a boat half-way across to refuel.

By swimming 

The sport of Channel swimming traces its origins to the latter part of the 19th century when Captain Matthew Webb made the first observed and unassisted swim across the Strait of Dover, swimming from England to France on 24–25 August 1875 in 21 hours 45 minutes.

Up to 1927, fewer than ten swimmers (including the first woman, Gertrude Ederle in 1926) had managed to successfully swim the English Channel, and many dubious claims had been made. The Channel Swimming Association (CSA) was founded to authenticate and ratify swimmers' claims to have swum the Channel and to verify crossing times. The CSA was dissolved in 1999 and was succeeded by two separate organisations: CSA Ltd (CSA) and the Channel Swimming and Piloting Federation (CSPF), both observe and authenticate cross-Channel swims in the Strait of Dover.  The Channel Crossing Association was also set up to cater for unorthodox crossings.

The team with the most Channel swims to its credit is the Serpentine Swimming Club in London, followed by the international Sri Chinmoy Marathon Team.

As at 2005, 811 people had completed 1,185 verified crossings under the rules of the CSA and the CSPF.  The number of swims conducted under and ratified by the Channel Swimming Association to 2005 was 982 by 665 people. This includes 24 two-way crossings and three three-way crossings. 

The Strait of Dover is the busiest stretch of water in the world. It is governed by International Law as described in Unorthodox Crossing of the Dover Strait Traffic Separation Scheme. It states: "[In] exceptional cases the French Maritime Authorities may grant authority for unorthodox craft to cross French territorial waters within the Traffic Separation Scheme when these craft set off from the British coast, on condition that the request for authorisation is sent to them with the opinion of the British Maritime Authorities."

The fastest verified swim of the Channel was by the Australian Trent Grimsey on 8 September 2012, in 6 hours 55 minutes, beating the previous record set in 2007 by Bulgarian swimmer Petar Stoychev.

There may have been some unreported swims of the Channel, by people intent on entering Britain in circumvention of immigration controls.  A failed attempt to cross the Channel by two Syrian refugees in October 2014 came to light when their bodies were discovered on the shores of the North Sea in Norway and the Netherlands.

By car 
On 16 September 1965, two Amphicars crossed from Dover to Calais.

Other types 

PLUTO was war-time fuel delivery project of "pipelines under the ocean" from England to France.  Though plagued with technical difficulties during the Battle of Normandy, the pipelines delivered about 8% of the fuel requirements of the allied forces between D-Day and VE-Day.

See also 

 English Channel migrant crossings (2018–present)
 France–UK border
 Anguilla Channel
 Booze cruise
 Guadeloupe Passage
 Invasions of the British Isles
 List of firsts in aviation
 Phoenix breakwaters

Explanatory notes

References

External links 

  Full Channel swim lists and swimmer information
 Oceanus Britannicus or British Sea
 Channel swimmers website
 Archives of long distance swimming
 Channel Swimming and Piloting Federation
 Channel Swimming Association
 World War II Eye Witness Account – Audio Recording Air Battle over the English Channel (1940)

 
English coast
European seas
France–United Kingdom border
Geography of Northwestern Europe
Landforms of Brittany
Landforms of Normandy
Landforms of Hauts-de-France
Marginal seas of the Atlantic Ocean
Bodies of water of the North Sea
Bays of England
Bays of Metropolitan France
Southern England